Kym Anderson  (born 26 February 1950 in Adelaide) is an Australian economist, specialising in trade policy and issues related to the World Trade Organization. He studied at the University of New England, the University of Adelaide and the University of Chicago before completing a PhD at Stanford University. He holds a Personal Chair in the School of Economics and is Foundation Executive Director of the Centre for International Economic Studies at the University of Adelaide

He has published around 40 books and more than 300 journal articles and chapters in other books. His most recent two books have received prizes for excellence in research and in communication from the American and Australian agricultural economics associations.

Career
In 1994, Anderson was elected a Fellow of the Academy of the Social Sciences in Australia.

He has taught as a guest professor at the Australian Defence College, Australian National University, Peking University, the University of Siena, the University of Sydney, Uppsala University, The World Trade Institute at the Swiss universities of Bern, Fribourg and Neuchatel (Master of International Law and Economics), and Georgetown University's Law School (JD and LLM programs in international economic law). He has conducted many short courses on agricultural and trade policy issues and WTO matters in numerous developing countries including China since 1995.

Anderson has spent periods of leave at Korea's International Economics Institute (1979), Korea's Rural Economics Institute (1980-81 as Ford Foundation Visiting Fellow in International Economics), the Australian Department of Trade (1983), Stockholm University's Institute for International Economic Studies (1988), the GATT (now WTO) Secretariat in Geneva (1990–92), and the Research Group of the World Bank in Washington DC (2004–07).

Anderson is a Research Fellow of Europe's London-based Centre for Economic Policy Research, a Fellow of the Academy of Social Sciences in Australia, a Fellow of the American Agricultural and Applied Economics Association, a Distinguished Fellow (and former president) of the Australian Agricultural and Resource Economics Society, a Fellow (and Vice-President) of the American Association of Wine Economists, and a Fellow of the Australian Institute of Company Directors. He is on the editorial board of several international academic journals, including the Journal of International Economic Law and, as Co-editor, the Journal of Wine Economics.

Publications

His three most recently finished books are:
Distortions to Agricultural Incentives: A Global Perspective,  1955–2007, London: Palgrave Macmillan and Washington DC: World  Bank, October 2009 (Recipient of the Australian Agricultural and Resource Economics Society Quality of Research Discovery Prize, 2010.)
Agricultural Price Distortions, Inequality and Poverty  (edited with J. Cockburn and W. Martin), Washington DC: World Bank, March 2010
The Political Economy of Agricultural Price Distortions, Cambridge and New York: Cambridge University Press, forthcoming late 2010

External links
profile
Staff profile, University of Adelaide

References

1950 births
Living people
Fellows of the Academy of the Social Sciences in Australia
Academic staff of the University of Adelaide
University of New England (Australia) alumni
University of Chicago alumni
Stanford University alumni
Companions of the Order of Australia
20th-century Australian  economists
Fellows of the Australian Institute of Company Directors
21st-century Australian  economists